Urodon is a genus of fungus weevils in the family of beetles known as Anthribidae.

References

Further reading

 
 
 
 
 

Anthribidae
Beetle genera